Nostrianus was Bishop of Naples, known for his opposition to Arianism and Pelagianism. In 439, he gave shelter to Bishop Quodvultdeus of Carthage, after the city's sacking by the Vandals.

References

Italian Roman Catholic saints
Canonizations by Pope Leo XIII
5th-century Italian bishops
Bishops of Naples